is the third-sector semipublic company that runs Port Island Line ("Port Liner") and Rokkō Island Line ("Rokkō Liner") automated guideway transit (AGT) systems in Kobe, Japan. When opened in 1981, the Port Liner was the world's first fully automated transport system.

In the Surutto KANSAI stored-fare system, the company is represented by the mark KS on the back of farecards.

Lines
Kōbe New Transit operates following two lines, which connect the artificial islands in the port of Kobe with the mainland:
Port Island Line (Port Liner)
Rokkō Island Line (Rokko Liner)

History
July 18, 1977: Company established
February 5, 1981: Port Island Line (Port Liner) began operation. The first practical AGT in Japan.
February 21, 1990: Rokkō Island Line (Rokkō Liner) began operation.
February 2, 2006: Port Liner extended to Kobe Airport.

Rolling stock

Current

1000 series
2000 series
2020 series
3000 series

Former
8000 series

Fares
The table below shows adult normal passenger fares. Children's fares are half price (fractions less than 10 yen are rounded up).

In fact, Minami Kōen Station, Naka-Futō Station, and Kita-Futō Station on the Port Liner are treated as the same station as Shimin Byōin Mae Station in calculating fare, and it is possible to get on and off at Minami Kōen Station, Naka Futō Station, and Kita Futō Station while using the commuting ticket by way of Shimin Byōin Mae Station.
Until February 1, 2006, it cost 240 yen (flat rate) to take either the Port Island Line or Rokkō Island Line.

See also
Monorails in Japan
Transport in Keihanshin
List of metro systems

References

External links

 Kobe New Transit Co.,LTD.

 
Railway companies established in 1977
1977 establishments in Japan
Transport in Kobe
Railway companies of Japan
Companies based in Kobe